The 6th Solheim Cup Match was held between 6 and 8 October 2000 at Loch Lomond Golf Club, Luss, Dunbartonshire, Scotland. Europe won the trophy for the second time, by a score of 14 to 11 points. Carin Koch holed the winning putt, coming back from three down to beat Michele Redman.

Teams
The European team consisted of seven automatic qualifiers and five wild card picks from Captain Dale Reid. The US team consisted of 10 automatic qualifiers and two picks from Captain Pat Bradley.

Europe
Captain
 Dale Reid – Ladybank, Scotland
Automatic qualifiers
 Sophie Gustafson – Särö, Sweden
 Trish Johnson – Bristol, England
 Laura Davies – Coventry, England
 Alison Nicholas – Gibraltar
 Patricia Meunier-Lebouc – Dijon, France
 Raquel Carriedo – Zaragoza, Spain
 Annika Sörenstam – Stockholm, Sweden
Captains Picks
 Helen Alfredsson – Gothenburg, Sweden
 Carin Koch – Kungälv, Sweden
 Janice Moodie – Glasgow, Scotland
 Liselotte Neumann – Finspång, Sweden
 Catrin Nilsmark – Gothenburg, Sweden

Captain
Pat Bradley – Westford, Massachusetts
Automatic qualifiers
Juli Inkster – Santa Cruz, California
Meg Mallon – Natick, Massachusetts
Rosie Jones – Santa Ana, California
Dottie Pepper – Saratoga Springs, New York
Sherri Steinhauer – Madison, Wisconsin
Pat Hurst – San Leandro, California
Kelly Robbins – Mt. Pleasant, Michigan
Michele Redman – Zanesville, Ohio
Nancy Scranton – Centralia, Illinois
Becky Iverson – Escanaba, Michigan
Captains Picks
Brandie Burton – San Bernardino, California
Beth Daniel – Charleston, South Carolina

Format
A total of 26 points were available, divided among three periods of team play, followed by one period of singles play. The first period, on Friday morning, was four rounds of foursomes. This was repeated in the second period on Friday afternoon. The third period on Saturday was six rounds of fourballs in which all 24 players (12 from each team) took part. The final 12 points were decided in a round of singles matchplay. This was a slight change from the 1998 format and was not kept, as the 2002 match reverted to the 1998 format.

Day one
Friday, 6 October 2000

Morning foursomes

Afternoon foursomes

Day two
Saturday, 7 October 2000

Fourball

Day three
Sunday, 8 October 2000

Singles

Individual player records
Each entry refers to the win–loss–half record of the player.

Europe

United States

Notes and references

Solheim Cup
Golf tournaments in Scotland
Sport in Argyll and Bute
Solheim Cup
Solheim Cup
Solheim Cup